The Time Game is a 1991 Australian television film directed by Alister Smart and starring Gabriel Andrews. The plot concerns a boy sent to his grandparents' home for a holiday.

References

External links

Australian television films
1991 television films
1991 films
1990s English-language films